Peer Borsky (born 5 November 1990) is a Swiss épée fencer, team bronze medallist in the 2014 World Fencing Championships and team European champion in the 2014 European Fencing Championships.

In the 2014–15 season Borsky climbed his first World Cup podium with a silver medal in the Doha Grand Prix.

References

External links
 Profile at the European Fencing Confederation

1990 births
Living people
Sportspeople from Zürich
Swiss épée fencers
Swiss male fencers
Fencers at the 2016 Summer Olympics
Olympic fencers of Switzerland
World Fencing Championships medalists